The  is a large pumped-storage hydroelectric power station in Kamikawa Town in the Kanzaki District of Hyōgo Prefecture, Japan. The facility is run by the Kansai Electric Power Company (KEPCO). The power plant started operation in October 1992 and all four units were commissioned by June 1995.

Like most pumped-storage facilities, the power station uses two reservoirs, releasing and pumping as the demand rises and falls. 
The Ota artificial lake is the upper reservoir, and is contained by five dams, numbered Ota Dam 1 to 5. The reservoir is fed by the river Ota. Hase reservoir is the lower reservoir and is contained by the Hase Dam. The upper Ota dams are rock-fill dams, while the lower Hase Dam is a gravity dam.

The plant started operation in December 1909 with a maximum output of 1450 kW.  with a generation capacity of 720 kW was added in May 1919.
The enlargement of the Ota reservoir and the building of the new Hase lower reservoir was implemented by Kansai Electric Power Company, with start of operation of the new pumped storage plant in 1992. The plant reached the current capacity in 1996 with all the four units in operation.

The power station employs four generation/pumping units. Two of the units are adjustable speed systems manufactured by Hitachi, allowing for a rapid variation of power levels during both pumping and generation. This allows the power station to respond more effectively to grid requests for the balancing of demand and supply, a role which is usually performed by thermal power plants. These units were the first large-capacity adjustable-speed pumped storage hydroelectric systems in the world.

See also 

 List of power stations in Japan
 Hydroelectricity in Japan
 List of pumped-storage hydroelectric power stations

Notes

Dams in Hyogo Prefecture
Pumped-storage hydroelectric power stations in Japan
Energy infrastructure completed in 1992
Dams completed in 1992
1992 establishments in Japan
Rock-filled dams
Gravity dams